Laird is a masculine given name. Notable people with the name include:

Laird Howard Barber (1848–1928), American lawyer, jurist, and politician
Laird Barron (born 1970), American author and poet
Laird Bell (1883–1965), American attorney, philanthropist, and businessman
Laird Cregar (1913–1944), American film actor
Laird Hamilton (born 1964), American big-wave surfer and co-inventor of tow-in surfing
Laird Smith (born 1913), Australian rules footballer
Laird A. Thompson (born 1947), American professor of astronomy

Masculine given names